Zia-ul-Haq (Punjabi, ; born 11 December 1994) is a Pakistani cricketer who plays as a left-arm fast bowler. He has been selected for Pakistan Under-19 cricket team. He has played first-class, List A, Twenty20, Under-19 ODI, Quaid-e-Azam Trophy and miscellaneous matches. He was named in Pakistan's Twenty20 International squad for their tour of Sri Lanka in July 2015.

In April 2018, he was named in Khyber Pakhtunkhwa's squad for the 2018 Pakistan Cup. He was the leading wicket-taker for Khyber Pakhtunkhwa in the tournament, with eleven dismissals in four matches. In March 2019, he was named in Federal Areas' squad for the 2019 Pakistan Cup.

References

External links
 

1994 births
Living people
Pakistani cricketers
Pakistan International Airlines cricketers
Lahore Shalimar cricketers
National Bank of Pakistan cricketers
Lahore Lions cricketers
Lahore Eagles cricketers
Lahore Qalandars cricketers
People from Vehari District
Southern Punjab (Pakistan) cricketers